This article summarizes equations in the theory of nuclear physics and particle physics.

Definitions

Equations

Nuclear structure

{| class="wikitable"
|-
! scope="col" width="100" | Physical situation
! scope="col" width="250" | Nomenclature
! scope="col" width="10" | Equations
|-
!Mass number
|
A = (Relative) atomic mass = Mass number = Sum of protons and neutrons
N = Number of neutrons
Z = Atomic number = Number of protons = Number of electrons

|
|-
!Mass in nuclei
|
''Mnuc = Mass of nucleus, bound nucleons
MΣ = Sum of masses for isolated nucleons
mp = proton rest mass
mn = neutron rest mass

|

|-
!Nuclear radius
|r0 ≈ 1.2 fm
|
hence (approximately)

nuclear volume ∝ A
nuclear surface ∝ A2/3

|-
!Nuclear binding energy, empirical curve
|Dimensionless parameters to fit experiment:

EB = binding energy,
av = nuclear volume coefficient,
as = nuclear surface coefficient,
ac = electrostatic interaction coefficient,
aa = symmetry/asymmetry extent coefficient for the numbers of neutrons/protons,
|
where (due to pairing of nuclei) 
δ(N, Z) = +1 even N, even Z,
δ(N, Z) = −1 odd N, odd Z,
δ(N, Z) = 0 odd A

|-
|}

Nuclear decay

Nuclear scattering theory

The following apply for the nuclear reaction:

a + b ↔ R → c

in the centre of mass frame, where a and b are the initial species about to collide, c is the final species, and R is the resonant state.

Fundamental forcesThese equations need to be refined such that the notation is defined as has been done for the previous sets of equations.'''

See also

Defining equation (physical chemistry)
Defining equation (physics)
List of electromagnetism equations
List of equations in classical mechanics
List of equations in quantum mechanics
List of equations in wave theory
List of photonics equations
List of relativistic equations
Relativistic wave equations

Footnotes

Sources

Further reading

 
 
 
 

Physical quantities
SI units
Equations of physics
Nuclear physics
Particle physics